Acuña Island, is a small island which lies  south of Point Rae, off the south coast of Laurie Island in the South Orkney Islands. Charted in 1903 by the Scottish National Antarctic Expedition under William Speirs Bruce, who named it after Hugo A. Acuña, pioneer Argentine meteorologist at the South Orkney station during 1904.

See also

External links 

Islands of the South Orkney Islands